Red Lake Township is one of the nine townships of Logan County, North Dakota, United States. It lies in the western part of the county and borders the following other townships within Logan County:
Dixon Unorganized Territory — north
Starkey Township — west
Bryant Township — northwest corner

External links
Official map by the United States Census Bureau; Logan County listed on page 6

Townships in Logan County, North Dakota
Townships in North Dakota